Sir Henry St Clair was a 13th- and 14th-century Scottish noble, who was the 7th Baron of Roslin and Lord of Catcune.

Henry was the son of William St. Clair and Amicia de Roskelyn. He fought at the Battle of Dunbar on 27 April 1296, where he and his father William were captured and he became a prisoner of King Edward I of England at St Briavels Castle. Henry was later exchanged for William FitzWarin in a prisoner exchange.

St Clair was the Sheriff of Lanark in 1305. Fought with his two sons John and William at the Battle of Bannockburn on 23–24 June 1314. King Robert I of Scotland rewarded him for his bravery with the gift of Pentland, the forest of Pentland Moor, Morton and Mortonhall. He was one of the Scottish nobles who in 1320 signed the Declaration of Arbroath. He died around 1335.

Family and issue
Henry married Alice de Fenton, daughter of William de Fenton of Baikie and Beaufort and Cecilia Bisset, and is known to have had the following issue;
William (d. 1330), who left a son, William St Clair, 8th Baron of Roslin (d. 1358), who married Isabella de Strathearn, daughter of Malise, Earl of Strathearn
John (d. 1330)

See also

Lord Sinclair
Earl of Caithness
Lord Herdmanston

References

Henry
13th-century Scottish people
14th-century Scottish people
Medieval Scottish knights
Scottish people of the Wars of Scottish Independence
Signatories to the Declaration of Arbroath
Henry
1331 deaths